Miggs may refer to:

Miss Miggs, character in Barnaby Rudge
Miggs (band)
Miggs Cuaderno